Vensys Energy AG (stylized as VENSYS) is a German gearless wind turbine manufacturer which is majority-owned by Chinese turbine manufacturer Goldwind.

Vensys licenses its products to several non-European manufacturers of wind turbines. In addition, Vensys itself manufactures plants on a small scale at its headquarters in Neunkirchen, Saarland.

The Vensys group includes Vensys Elektrotechnik GmbH in Diepholz , which manufactures the electrical components, and NEVEN Windenergie GmbH in Trier, which is involved in project development.

The Goldwind Wind Energy GmbH based in Hamburg has been the company's largest single shareholder since 2008 with a 70% stake.

Licensee
 Goldwind
 Enerwind
 Eozen
 ReGen

References

Wind turbine manufacturers
Engineering companies of Germany
2008 mergers and acquisitions
German brands